Aspropyrgos is located in the Athens metropolitan area and is a municipality in the West Attica regional unit, in Attica, Greece.  The municipality had a population of 30,251 at the 2011 census. It has an area of 101.983 km2.

Etymology

Geography

Aspropyrgos is located 15 km northwest of the city center of Athens in the Thriasio Plain. It is 5 km northeast of Elefsina, near the Saronic Gulf coast. Mount Parnitha forms its northern border, and the Aigaleo hills its southeastern border. The Elefsina Military Airbase lies to its west.  
The main street is Dimokratias ('Democracy') Avenue. Aspropyrgos can be accessed from the Motorway 6 (Elefsina - Athens International Airport) and the Motorway 65 (Ano Liosia - Aspropyrgos). It is also accessible through the Motorway A6 exit 4. (The industrial area is in the southeastern part of Aspropyrgos. The Aspropyrgos railway station is served by Proastiakos trains from the Athens International Airport to Kiato (Peloponnese).

Climate

Aspropyrgos has a hot mediterranean climate with mild winters and hot summers. In June 2007 the meteorological station of the Aspropyrgos Municipality located in the Germanika area of Aspropyrgos registered 47.5°C  Also, in June 2017 and August 2021, Aspropyrgos recorded temperatures of around 45°C.

Industry

Aspropyrgos consists of a residential downtown area and an industrial area where a number of storage warehouses, metal recycling facilities, logistics handlers, wholesalers, small construction companies and other industrial businesses operate.
The Aspropyrgos Refinery, south of the city and next to the sea, has been producing oil for many years. As a consequence, pollution has been a problem for years. The refinery includes depots in the southern and eastern parts, and some in the western part and at a dock to the southwest.

Population

See also
 List of cities in Greece

References

External links
Official website 

Municipalities of Attica
Populated places in West Attica